In the Sargasso Sea is a novel written in 1898 by Thomas Allibone Janvier. Recently, Kessinger Publishing's rare reprints has re-issued the book.

Plot
The protagonist, Roger Stetworth, unwillingly joins a slave ship called the Golden Hind captained by Luke Chilton. (When Chilton demanded that Roger "sign aboard" he refused and was clubbed on the head and thrown overboard.) He is rescued by the Hurst Castle and doctored by a painfully stereotyped Irishman. The Hurst Castle is abandoned but does not founder in a gale and the crew, unable to get to him, are forced to leave Stetworth marooned aboard. The ship drifts into the center of the Sargasso Sea where Stetworth finds himself in a ships' graveyard in which survivors of previous shipwrecks still inhabit the forgotten ships.  Stetworth must rely on his own ingenuity to get free from the choking sargasso weeds.

External links
 

1898 American novels
1890s children's books
American adventure novels
American children's novels
Novels about slavery
Novels set on ships